The cone-shape distribution function, also known as the Zhao–Atlas–Marks time-frequency distribution,  (acronymized as the ZAM  distribution or ZAMD), is one of the members of Cohen's class distribution function. It was first proposed by Yunxin Zhao, Les E. Atlas, and Robert J. Marks II in 1990. The distribution's name stems from the twin cone shape of the distribution's kernel function on the  plane. The advantage of the cone kernel function is that it can completely remove the cross-term between two components having the same center frequency. Cross-term results from components with the same time center, however, cannot be completely removed by the cone-shaped kernel.

Mathematical definition 
The definition of the cone-shape distribution function is:

where

and the kernel function is

The kernel function in  domain is defined as:

Following are the magnitude distribution of the kernel function in  domain.

Following are the magnitude distribution of the kernel function in  domain with different  values.

As is seen in the figure above, a properly chosen kernel of cone-shape distribution function can filter out the interference on the  axis in the  domain, or the ambiguity domain. Therefore, unlike the Choi-Williams distribution function, the cone-shape distribution function can effectively reduce the cross-term results form two component with same center frequency. However, the cross-terms on the  axis are still preserved.

The cone-shape distribution function is in the MATLAB Time-Frequency Toolbox and National Instruments' LabVIEW Tools for Time-Frequency, Time-Series, and Wavelet Analysis

See also 
Cohen's class distribution function
Choi-Williams distribution function 
Wigner distribution function
Ambiguity function
Short-time Fourier transform

References

Time–frequency analysis
Transforms